Mathematische Zeitschrift (German for Mathematical Journal) is a mathematical journal for pure and applied mathematics published by Springer Verlag.

It was founded in 1918 and edited by Leon Lichtenstein together with Konrad Knopp, Erhard Schmidt, and Issai Schur. Past editors include Erich Kamke, Friedrich Karl Schmidt, Rolf Nevanlinna, Helmut Wielandt, and Olivier Debarre.

External links 
 
 

Mathematics journals
Publications established in 1918